The Heart of the Hills is a 1914 silent short film directed by and starring Wallace Reid and co-starring his wife Dorothy Davenport. It was produced by the Rex Motion Picture Company and distributed through the Universal Film Manufacturing Company.

Cast
Wallace Reid - Dave the Woodsman
Dorothy Davenport - The Government Detective
Phil Dunham - Dave's Brother
Ed Brady - 
Lucile Wilson -

See also
Wallace Reid filmography

References

External links
The Heart of the Hills at IMDb.com

1914 films
Lost American films
Universal Pictures short films
Films directed by Wallace Reid
American silent short films
American black-and-white films
1910s American films